Joseph Marius Babo (January 14, 1756 in Ehrenbreitstein – February 5, 1822 in Munich). As a dramatist, Babo preferred action based on history. In Otto von Wittelsbach, written in 1781, he followed the path blazed by Goethe in Götz von Berlichingen. Sometimes one could see he was acquainted with Shakespeare. He filled a variety of pedagogical and bureaucratic roles related to the theater over his life.

Works

Arno (1776)
Das Lustlager (1778, probable author)
Das Winterquartier in Amerika (1778)
Dagobert der Franken König (1779; English edition: Dagobert, King of the Franks, 1800)
Reinhold und Armida (1780)
Die Römer in Teutschland (1780)
Otto von Wittelsbach (1782), a play based on the life of Otto II Wittelsbach, Duke of Bavaria (1206–1253), and Count Palatine of the Rhine
Die Maler (1783)
Die Fräulein Wohlerzogen (1783)
Ueber Freymaurer. Erste Warnung (1784)
Nöthige Beylage zur Schrift: Über die Freymaurer „erste Warnung“ (1784)
Gemälde aus dem Leben der Menschen (1784)
Vollständiges Tagebuch der merkwürdigsten Begebenheiten und Revolutionen in Paris (1789, translated from French)
Die Strelitzen (1790)
Bürgerglück (1792)
Anleitung zur Himmelskunde in leichtfaßlichen astronomischen Unterhaltungen (1793)
Schauspiele (1793)
Neue Schauspiele (1804)
Der Puls (1805)
Albrechts Rache für Agnes (1808)

Bibliography
 Pfeuffer, Ludwig: Joseph Marius Babo als Leiter des Münchener Nationaltheaters 1799–1810. München, Univ., Diss., 1913
 Wurst, Jürgen: Joseph Marius Babo. In: Wurst, Jürgen und Langheiter, Alexander (Hrsg.): Monachia. München: Städtische Galerie im Lenbachhaus, 2005. S. 163.

References 

 Portions of this article are based on translations from the German Wikipedia.
Carl Schurz, Lebenserinnerungen bis zum Jahre 1852, Berlin: Georg Reimer, 1906 and 1911.  As a student in a gymnasium in Cologne (Chapter 3), Schurz was in the care of a locksmith who took him to plays occasionally.  Schurz writes:  “The taste of my friend the locksmith ran to knight dramas ...  The first piece I saw at the side of my locksmith was Otto von Wittelsbach, at that time a famous knight play in which the hero meets King Philipp of Swabia, who cheats him in a chess game.  With an armored fist, the hero strikes the chess board so the pieces fly over the stage, and then strikes the king down with a blow from his sword.”

External links 
 
Bürgerglück in Google Books. 
Anleitung zur Himmelskunde in leichtfaßlichen astronomischen Unterhaltungen in Google Books. 

1756 births
1822 deaths
German male dramatists and playwrights
18th-century German dramatists and playwrights
19th-century German dramatists and playwrights
19th-century German male writers
19th-century German writers
18th-century German male writers